Ivan Bruno Maziero (born 1 June 1969) commonly known as Macarrão, is a Brazilian handball player. He competed at the 1992 Summer Olympics, the 1996 Summer Olympics and the 2004 Summer Olympics.

References

1969 births
Living people
Brazilian male handball players
Olympic handball players of Brazil
Handball players at the 1992 Summer Olympics
Handball players at the 1996 Summer Olympics
Handball players at the 2004 Summer Olympics
Sportspeople from Santa Catarina (state)
20th-century Brazilian people
21st-century Brazilian people